Viscount of la Armería is a hereditary title in the Peerage of Spain, granted in 1694 by Charles II to José de Aldaz y Aguirre, owner of two of the most important armouries in Spain, the "Real Fábrica de Armas de Orbaizeta" and the "Real Fábrica de Municiones de Olaverri", hence the name of the title (armería is Spanish for armoury).

It was traditionally held by the heir apparent to the Marquessate of Monte Real, but it was eventually incorporated into the House of Valdueza and is now used by the heir to that title.

Viscounts of la Armería (1694)

 José de Aldaz y Aguirre, 1st Viscount of la Armería
 María Josefa de Samaniego y Flores de Septién, 2nd Viscountess of la Armería
 Pedro de Samaniego Montemayor y Córdoba, 3rd Viscount of la Armería
 Manuel de Samaniego y Pizarro, 4th Viscount of la Armería
 Matías de Samaniego y Pizarro, 5th Viscount of la Armería
 María Donata de Samaniego y Pizarro, 6th Viscountess of la Armería
 Juana Regis de Armendáriz y Samaniego, 7th Viscountess of la Armería
 Joaquín Antonio de Samaniego y Urbina, 8th Viscount of la Armería
 Manuel de Samaniego y Asprer, 9th Viscount of la Armería
 Honorio de Samaniego y Pando, 10th Viscount of la Armería
 Mariano Álvarez de Toledo y Cabeza de Vaca, 11th Viscount of la Armería
 Alonso Álvarez de Toledo y Cabeza de Vaca, 12th Viscount of la Armería
 Alonso Álvarez de Toledo y Urquijo, 13th Viscount of la Armería 
 Fadrique Álvarez de Toledo y Argüelles, 14th Viscount of la Armería

See also
Orbaizeta

References

Bibliography
 

Viscounts of Spain
Lists of Spanish nobility
Noble titles created in 1694